Kentucky Route 15 begins at a junction of US 119/Corridor F & Business KY 15 in Whitesburg, and terminates in Winchester at US 60. It is a major route, connecting the coalfields of the Cumberland Plateau with Lexington and other cities in the Bluegrass region. The segment from Whitesburg to KY 15 at Campton, which in turn connects to the Bert T. Combs Mountain Parkway near the town, is also the primary part of Corridor I of the Appalachian Development Highway System.

Future

Currently, KY 15 is being relocated onto a new four-lane divided alignment in phases. Construction on section 17 of the relocation project is from KY 205 at Vancleve to Fivemile; construction began on January 6, 2005, at a cost of $36.4 million and is 100% complete. Work is finished on section 16 from Fivemile to Wolverine;. There are additional plans to reconstruct the segment from Jackson south to Hazard on new alignment beginning in 2008.

The current construction is progressing from Vancleve to Jackson.  Local reports suggest that the roadway will be opening for traffic flow by the summer of 2013.  Construction of the section between Jackson and Haddix, KY has not started.  The current budget crisis and lowered revenues for state and federal construction projects may delay groundbreaking on that section for years. (Updated June 2013)

Currently (Jan. 2021), construction is nearing completion north of Hazard.  This section was expanded to four lanes from the Hazard bypass to Speedway Road.  This project was designed to replace one of the heaviest used sections of two way, two lane traffic in Kentucky. The upgrade involved replacing several bridges and making large cuts to accommodate the widened roadway. An access road was added to allow traffic to enter and exit at Bonnyman near the post office.  No projected date of construction has been made public for the section of roadway from Jackson to the current expansion.

Major intersections

Special routes

Kentucky Route 15X

Kentucky Route 15 Business in Whitesburg, in Letcher County, signed as KY 15X, is the business route of KY 15 in Whitesburg. It begins at KY 15's southern terminus and ends at KY 15 north of town.

Kentucky Route 15 Connector

Kentucky Route 15 Connector (KY 15C) provides access from KY 15 to KY 15X and the Letcher County Veterans Memorial Museum in Whitesburg.

Kentucky Route 15 Business (Hazard) 

Kentucky Route 15 Business (KY 15 BUS) is a business route of KY 15 in Hazard, Perry County. It is the original alignment of KY 15 through the city.

Kentucky Route 15 Spur

Kentucky Route 15 Spur (KY 15 Spur) is the spur route connecting KY 15 with the Bert T. Combs Mountain Parkway's Exit 46 interchange at Campton, in Wolfe County. This roadway is not accessible from the Mountain Parkway's westbound lanes.

References

 
0015
0015
0015
0015
0015
0015
0015
0015